J. R. Monterose is the debut album by American saxophonist J. R. Monterose recorded in 1956 and released on the Blue Note label.

Reception

The Allmusic review by Stephen Thomas Erlewine awarded the album 4½ stars and stated "J. R. Monterose's first session as a leader was a thoroughly enjoyable set of swinging, straight-ahead bop that revealed him as a saxophonist with a knack for powerful, robust leads in the vein of Sonny Rollins and Coleman Hawkins... In fact, the quality of the music is so strong, J. R. Monterose qualifies as one of the underappreciated gems in Blue Note's mid-'50s catalog".

Track listing
All compositions by J. R. Monterose except as indicated
 "Wee-Jay" - 6:56
 "The Third" (Donald Byrd) - 5:15
 "Bobbie Pin" - 8:03
 "Marc V" - 6:30
 "Ka-Link" (Philly Joe Jones) - 9:01
 "Beauteous" (Paul Chambers) - 5:24
 "Wee-Jay" [alternate take] - 7:17 Bonus track on CD reissue
Recorded at Rudy Van Gelder Studio, Hackensack, New Jersey on October 21, 1956.

Personnel
J. R. Monterose - tenor saxophone
Ira Sullivan - trumpet
Horace Silver - piano
Wilbur Ware - bass
Philly Joe Jones - drums

References

Blue Note Records albums
J. R. Monterose albums
1956 debut albums
Albums produced by Alfred Lion
Albums recorded at Van Gelder Studio